Amolops assamensis is a species of frogs that was discovered in 2008 in Mayeng Hill Reserve Forest, Kamrup District, Assam in north-eastern India. Little is known about this species, which is associated with fast flowing streams.

References

assamensis
Amphibians described in 2008
Frogs of India
Endemic fauna of India